COHS may refer to:

Education 
 Cardinal O'Hara High School (Springfield, Pennsylvania), United States
 Cardinal O'Hara High School (Tonawanda, New York), United States
 Coldspring-Oakhurst High School, Coldspring, Texas, United States
 Cosumnes Oaks High School, Elk Grove, California, United States
 Texas Tech University College of Human Sciences, Lubbock, Texas, United States

Other uses 
 Controlled ovarian hyperstimulation, a technique in assisted reproduction